Skagabyggð is a municipality in Iceland. It surrounds the municipality of Skagaströnd. In June 2021, residents rejected a proposal to merge the municipality with the neighboring municipalities of Skagaströnd, Blönduósbær and Húnavatnshreppur.

References

Municipalities of Iceland
Northwestern Region (Iceland)